A list of the films produced in Mexico in 1982 (see 1982 in film):

1982

External links

1982
Films
Lists of 1982 films by country or language